Timber Peak is the high peak (3,070 m) above Priestley Glacier, on the south side. The peak is 2 nautical miles (3.7 km) west-northwest of the summit of Mount New Zealand in the Eisenhower Range, Victoria Land. The Southern Party of New Zealand Geological Survey Antarctic Expedition (NZGSAE) (1962–63) gave this name because petrified sections of tree branches were found in sandstone deposits at this point.

Mountains of Victoria Land
Scott Coast